Thomas Holm (born 1978) is a Danish singer-songwriter.

Holm was born and raised in Kjellerup and was a graduate student in Political Science at the University of Copenhagen when he began his musical career.

He debuted with the single "Nitten" (The Short Straw) in 2009 and was also involved in the single "Skrøbeligt fundament (Fragile Foundation)" in support of the 2010 earthquake in Haiti. On the album "En hyldest til Sebastian (A Tribute to Sebastian)", he sings a reinterpretation of "80'ernes Boheme (80s Bohemian)", which was first published in 1983.

His debut album "Middelklassehelt (Middle Class Hero)", produced by Henrik Balling, was published by Copenhagen Records in April 2010. The single, "Ikea", was released in September 2010.

Thomas Holm is boyfriend of singer Fallulah.

Discography

Studio albums 
Middelklassehelt (2010)

Singles 
Nitten (2009)
Selvmord På Dansegulvet (2010)
Ikea (2010)
Lidt For Lidt (2010)
En Stivnet Smiler (Promo) (2010)
Knep Smerten Væk (2011)
Byen Kalder (2012)
Jul, For Helvede (2015)

As a Guest Artist 
80'ernes Boheme (80s Bohemian) (2009)
Skrøbeligt fundament (Fragile Foundation) (2010)

External links
 Thomas Holm's Homepage (Facebook)

1978 births
Living people
Date of birth missing (living people)
Danish pop singers
Danish  male singer-songwriters
Musicians from Copenhagen
21st-century Danish male  singers
People from Kjellerup